Coleophora flammea is a moth of the family Coleophoridae. It is found in Afghanistan.

References

flammea
Moths described in 1994
Moths of Asia